Keira Fae Walsh (born 8 April 1997) is an English professional footballer who plays as a midfielder for Liga F club Barcelona and the England women's national team. She is considered both a playmaker and a defensive midfielder. She has previously played for Blackburn Rovers and Manchester City, and Great Britain at the Olympics. With Manchester City, she topped the Women's Super League in 2016; won the FA Cup three times; and won the League Cup four times, taking one domestic treble. She was part of the England team that won the UEFA Women's Euro 2022, and was named player of the match in the final.

Walsh became a first-team regular at City as a teenager during their 2014 campaign, playing a key role in helping the team secure their first League Cup. She stayed with the side for nine seasons (in eight years), briefly captaining them several times, and in March 2022 became the second player to reach 200 appearances for them; when she left to join Barcelona later that year, she jointly held City's record for number of appearances and set a world-record fee for a female footballer.

She represented England for their age-group teams from the age of twelve before making her senior debut in 2017, for 2019 FIFA Women's World Cup qualifying, and starting as captain in a match a year later. She was named in the Team of the Tournament for the 2022 Euro. She has been described as one of the best midfielders in the world.

Early years
Keira Fae Walsh was born on 8 April 1997 in Rochdale to Peter and Tracy Walsh, and was raised by the Pennines in Syke, a rural suburb of the town. Here she practised football with her father on the field across from their house from about the age of five. She played for local side Pearson Juniors under-7s, and then Samba Stars – both coached by the father of her primary school best friend, who initially took her along – until she turned eleven.

Walsh attended Haslingden High School and Bacup and Rawtenstall Grammar School Sixth Form, both in Rossendale; after the Lionesses won the 2022 Euro, local bus company Rosso, which runs between Rochdale and Rossendale, named a bus after Walsh. Haslingden High School had girls' football teams in the first few year groups, which Walsh played for, reaching a national final. She joined Manchester City, the team she and her family support, in July 2014, when she was seventeen; City sent her to St Bede's College in Manchester to finish her A-Levels while she trained and played with them. Future teammate Georgia Stanway would also attend St Bede's.

Though a dedicated Manchester City fan, having had pet fish named after Shaun Goater and Nicolas Anelka, Walsh was inspired as a child by Spanish football, in part due to having family in Spain and often playing in the country when visiting them, and because her father encouraged her to watch Barcelona play. She also briefly supported Arsenal, due to being a fan of Cesc Fàbregas, until she saw David Silva, her favourite player, with City.

In 2008, aged eleven, Walsh was named Greater Manchester Young Sports Person of the Year. She was ranked number 1 in the county in under-13 badminton between 2007 and 2009, having taken up the sport aged nine and representing Rochdale in it. She also played cricket for Lancashire, represented Rochdale in swimming and netball, and played football at the Blackburn Rovers Girls' Centre of Excellence. Walsh played for Lancashire in the 2013 English Schools' Football Association County Cup; eleven members of this Lancashire squad came from Blackburn Rovers. Following the 2022 Euro win, Walsh received the freedom of the borough of Rochdale.

Club career

Blackburn Rovers

Youth, 2008–14
Seeking a way to continue playing football when she could no longer play with boys, Walsh attended a Football Association (FA) Skills Centre based at Kingsway Park High School at the age of eleven, where she was coached by Fara Williams. She then went to trials at the Blackburn Rovers Girls' Centre of Excellence, put forward by her childhood coach and encouraged by good performances at the Skills Centre, and joined them in 2008. She played for Blackburn Rovers in their age-group teams from under-12 through under-17. Though she began playing as a right-footed left-back, and then a centre-half, she moved to the central midfield at Blackburn when a new coach came in for the under-14 team and suggested she try the position.

With the Blackburn youth teams, and despite playing in defense and midfield, Walsh was a prolific goalscorer, making four goals in six games in her first year at the club. She played for the under-17 team in the 2013 FA Girls' Youth Cup final against Arsenal, narrowly missing an opening goal, with Blackburn eventually losing the match. In the 2013–14 season, Walsh played in (and started) eleven matches for the Blackburn Rovers under-17 team, scoring ten goals; in their 2014 FA Youth Cup quarter-final against Sunderland she scored a hat-trick in thirteen minutes.

Senior, 2014
In February 2014, when she was sixteen, Walsh signed for Blackburn Rovers' first team until the end of the season, debuting as a half time substitute four days later. The club had suffered a poor start to the league that season, and the addition of Walsh was said to be key to maintaining their place in it. Still involved with the under-17 side, Walsh played in nine FA Women's Northern Premier League matches for the first team, scoring three goals, including the team's goal of the season – a "stunning" second goal against Derby County in March that brought Blackburn up from relegation. She also played for the team in the final of the Lancashire Women's Challenge Cup, said to be the best player in the match despite the team losing, and in the fourth round of the FA Women's Cup. She left both youth and senior Blackburn Rovers sides in 2014, picking up a Contribution Award for six seasons with them.

Manchester City

2014
Walsh began looking to join a Women's Super League (WSL) team shortly after she turned seventeen when she was still playing with the under-17 Blackburn Rovers side. She had been offered a place on Everton's development squad without trialling and was planning to join, despite Manchester City, the club she supports, preparing to enter the WSL and holding trials. Walsh's mother encouraged her to attend the trials for the City development squad in July 2014; before the session was complete, first team coach Nick Cushing, who had gone as an observer, asked to sign her to the main squad as their playmaking midfielder. Cushing would later say that Walsh has "the best football brain" of any player he has coached, adding that "some players are almost touched by God"; in response, Walsh deflected praise, saying that Cushing's coaching style benefits technical and tactical players.

Within ten days of the City trials, in July 2014, Walsh made her senior debut for Manchester City as a substitute in a 1–0 win over Notts County. Too young for a professional contract, she officially trained with the development squad, for which she never made an appearance; by the end of the 2014 season she regularly had a starting position in the first team. She was also important within the City side that won the 2014 League Cup, starting in the final. Having not expected to play, she had initially told her parents not to travel for the game. She performed particularly well in it, marking England legend Kelly Smith out of the game and "leaving the footballing world intrigued" by the unknown talent.

2015 
In June 2015, Walsh signed her first senior contract with the club, though did not play for much of this year due to injury. Manchester City added her to their 2015 League Cup squad in August, but the FA "might have" lost the registration documents for the change, causing City to be briefly suspended for fielding an unregistered player before the matter was resolved. The team's quarter-final against Arsenal, which City lost, had been postponed due to the investigation. City still came second in the league in 2015, which also allowed them to compete in the Champions League the following year. A crucial part of his City plans since the start, Cushing started building the team around Walsh and made her one of its vice-captains.

2016
The team were unbeaten in their 2016 league campaign; Walsh was injured again at the start of the season but worked her way back onto the squad and, in September, was described as their "unsung hero" by 90min. Having gone undefeated in the league in 2016, City won the league in September with a game to spare, Walsh described as "unassuming" and "pivotal" in their success. In October, they won the 2016 league cup for the domestic double. On 9 November 2016, Walsh scored her first goal for City, a long-range strike from outside the area, in a 1–0 victory against Brøndby IF in the first leg of the last-16 tie in their debut Champions League. Two days later, she extended her contract with City through 2020. For the 2015–16 season, Walsh was nominated for the Professional Footballers' Association (PFA) Women's Young Player of the Year award; she would see further nominations for this award every year up to and including the 2018–19 season.

2017 
With Manchester City, Walsh won all three women's domestic titles over what would be a regular 2016–17 season (2016 FA WSL, 2016 WSL Cup, 2016–17 FA Women's Cup); the WSL ran calendar year seasons until 2017, curtailing the season in spring to start a new one in autumn that matched European schedules. For the 2017 FA Cup final, in which City defeated Birmingham 4–1, Walsh (who was not among the goalscorers) was named player of the match, saying only that "it was a real team effort" and that it was special to win a trophy at Wembley; Cushing heaped praise on her performance and maturity.

2017–18

During the summer pre-season for the 2017–18 season, Walsh captained the team. At the end of 2017, also accounting for the previous season, Walsh was listed at number 98 on The 100 Best Female Footballers in the World list by The Offside Rule/The Guardian. The team went out of the Women's FA Cup in the semi-finals in 2018. In 2018, Walsh was nominated for the FWA Women's Footballer of the Year Award and the FSF Women's Player of the Year Award.

2018–19 
At the end of stoppage time during City's 3–0 victory over Liverpool in November 2018 – in which Walsh provided the assist for the only open play goal and got in several shots on target (all saved) herself – Liverpool's Rinsola Babajide made a harsh tackle that took down Walsh, who stayed down in pain before being stretchered off and the game ended. After initial fears of a broken leg, assessment confirmed she only suffered a minor knee injury. She was named player of the match by City's official supporters club, having been on the shortlist before the injury.

City reclaimed the FA Cup in 2019, defeating West Ham in the final 3–0, with Walsh scoring the opening goal. The team also won the League Cup for a domestic double. In April 2019, Walsh was nominated for both the PFA Women's Young Player and Women's Players' Player of the Year award. In September 2019, Walsh was shortlisted for the dream team FIFA FIFPRO The Best Women's World 11, the only English midfielder to be so. At the end of the year, she placed joint-ninth (with Jennifer Hermoso) on the International Federation of Football History & Statistics (IFFHS) ranking of the Women's World Best Playmaker.

2019–20
With doubts about her career following criticism at the 2019 FIFA Women's World Cup, Walsh did not want to play football in England, thinking she was not what the domestic fans wanted to see in a holding midfielder. Prior to the 2019–20 season, she handed in a transfer request amid interest from Lyon and Atlético Madrid. On 29 July, she withdrew her transfer request; Cushing had convinced her to stay by encouraging her and joking that he would dress like Pep Guardiola, one of Walsh's idols, to be more like him. Cushing said that Walsh was integral to City's system and it was imperative the club retain her, while adapting to other transfers. He re-emphasised Walsh's importance to the side after she scored a goal from distance then created the opportunity for a second in an October 2019 match that saw them defeat Birmingham 3–0.

During a Manchester derby in the League Cup on 20 October 2019, Walsh was given a straight red card for a tackle on Manchester United's Kirsty Hanson. City lost 0–2, with Walsh later reflecting that her conduct came from being a fan of her team and frustrated that their rivals were winning, and that she had since come to practice more control over her support than she displayed in the match. Around this time, Walsh's abilities were said to be maturing. While still "an energetic presence in midfield that at times needs to be dialled down", and sometimes requiring the presence of experienced midfielder Jill Scott in support, she had tightened her defensive capabilities and discipline to complement her excellent positioning and playmaking skill, in which she was also becoming more assured.

She signed a new three-year contract on 7 February 2020; 90min wrote that this was somewhat surprising to onlookers – considering Walsh's long tenure, prior transfer request, and Cushing recently leaving the club – but that City and its fans would welcome her decision. Come the end of the season, her leadership and talent in midfield saw her described as "unmatched".

2020–21
Walsh started her 2020–21 pre-season with City by scoring a goal in a 6–0 win before they contested, but lost, the Women's FA Community Shield in its first edition since 2008.

In November 2020, Walsh scored the third goal for City in an 8–1 win over Bristol. At the end of 2020, Walsh was ranked 62 on the Offside Rule/The Guardian list of the 100 best female footballers in the world. In March 2021, Walsh scored the sole goal on captain Steph Houghton's 200th cap, taking City to a ninth consecutive WSL victory; later in March, Houghton picked up an injury that kept her out for over a month, and Walsh took up the armband as City captain. She was also handed the armband when Ellen White was substituted off in the team's home-leg Champions League quarter-final fixture against Barcelona, a 2–1 victory that was Barcelona's only loss on their route to the Champions League title; Walsh was named player of the match with what was described as "the complete midfield performance". In the reverse fixture a week earlier, City had suffered their worst defeat since 2014, a 0–3 loss that saw Barcelona advance on aggregate.

For the 2020–21 season, Walsh was nominated for the England Women's Player of the Year award.

2021–22
With Walsh one of several injured players out at the start of the 2021–22 season, Manchester City began poorly. Walsh returned to playing in October 2021 and, in November, scored a powerful strike against Leicester from the edge of the box, which was shortlisted for the WSL goal of the month. Manchester City under Gareth Taylor (who replaced Cushing as manager in 2020), from the start but particularly in the 2021–22 season, played Walsh differently; her passing metrics, as well as "almost all of her metrics around attacking play", "dropped significantly" as she was encouraged to sit and pass in defense. Podcast The Offside Rule said in early July 2022 that this change had left Walsh, a playmaker now limited in opportunities to progress play and superfluous defensively, "with rather little to do."

In March 2022, Walsh made her 200th appearance for the club, becoming the second player, after Houghton, to reach a double century. She was ranked the sixth-best UEFA Women's Player of the Year for 2021–22, and the third-best England Women's Player of the Year in October 2022. Later in October, she was nominated for the FSA Women's Player of the Year Award.

2022–23 
After playing two Champions League qualification matches for City in August 2022, as part of the 2022–23 pre-season, Walsh left the club in September after eight years; eight major trophies; and 211 appearances, the joint-record number of appearances for the club (with Houghton) at the time. In a post on Instagram, Walsh wrote: "Even though I will no longer play in the shirt, City is in my blood and always will be." She later said that she had had no intention of leaving City in the summer of 2022, and so it was a hard decision, but that she felt it was the right time to leave her comfort zone.

Barcelona

Transfer and 2022–23 

With one year left on her City contract, Walsh again showed interest in leaving the club following the 2021–22 season, with interest from "several top European clubs" including Chelsea and Barcelona. Over the summer of 2022, several key members of City's women's squad left either through free transfer or retirement. Though women's football rarely drew transfer fees, both Chelsea and Barcelona made Manchester City large offers for Walsh. Having been inspired by Barcelona as a child, and told by her father that she should endeavour to play for them, Walsh wanted to join this team; Barcelona felt the need to bring in reinforcements after injury to star midfielder Alexia Putellas and other departures, and made several offers. After a lengthy high-profile pursuit, the last of Barcelona's offers, around £400,000 (up to €470,000 including bonuses), a world-record fee, was accepted shortly before the transfer deadline on 7 September 2022. This was considerably higher than the previous women's transfer record, set when Pernille Harder transferred for £250,000 in 2020, and Barcelona's previous record signing of a female player, set when they purchased Mapi León for €50,000 in 2017. Walsh has said that while "the price tag [is] a nice feeling", she prefers not to be the centre of attention. She signed to Barcelona for three years, joining England teammate Lucy Bronze, who also moved from City to Barcelona in 2022.

At the end of 2022, Walsh featured near the top of several women's football rankings, including coming third on the IFFHS ranking of the Women's World Best Playmaker; entering the Top 10 of the list of the 100 Best Female Footballers; and being named to the FIFPRO World 11. With Barcelona having started her in many games of the 2022–23 season, including the most important ones, Walsh won her first title with them with the 2022–23 Supercopa de España: she helped her team to victory playing in both the semi-final and, despite having gone off during extra-time in the semi-final with an injury, the final three days later on 22 January 2023. In subsequent games, she was rested with the injury; shortly after her return she scored her first goal for Barcelona, on 5 February against Real Betis, with a shot from outside the box.

International career

Youth
In November 2009, Walsh, aged twelve, received her first call-up to train for the England under-15 girls, making her the youngest person on the squad. She played for them in 2010 and 2011. Though she would go on to feature in the England squads for all youth age groups, she did not get a chance to thrive in them, only participating in one major competition. She later reflected that the lack of youth experience may have contributed to her being unprepared for the criticism players receive at international tournaments when she joined the senior squad.

Moving into the under-17 women's squad as its vice-captain, Walsh was considered a key player in the 2013 season. During the July 2013 women's Nordic Tournament she scored two goals, including one in the first minute of the play-off match against Iceland. In November 2013, she was named as a forward in the squad for the 2014 UEFA Women's Under-17 Championship (held in December 2013), helping England through to the knockout stages and a fourth-place finish in the competition.

Walsh was then selected to the under-19 England squad while still playing at under-17 club level. Called to training with the second team in January 2014, she made a competitive appearance for the first team a week later. In the youth squads, Walsh was considered the class clown to Leah Williamson's serious captain. After under-17, Walsh was not always brought in for training camps and, when she was sixteen and in the under-19 outfit, was told by coach Mo Marley that she needed to work harder; Walsh has said missing out on selections at this age and Marley's warning, which she felt was tough love and indicative of Marley believing in her, "was a massive career defining moment". Realising she did not want to lose out on football, Walsh began to apply herself.

She served as under-19 captain for some of their appearances at the March 2015 La Manga Tournament in Spain, and wore the armband again after returning from injury for 2016 under-19 Euro preparation matches in September and November 2015. She then picked up another ankle injury while on international duty with the under-19 side in La Manga in March 2016. Walsh was named in the squad for an under-20 tournament in September 2016, but had to withdraw. With the under-23 squad, Walsh played in La Manga and won the Nordic Tournament in 2017.

Senior

England 

In November 2017, Walsh was called up to the senior England squad for the first time, along with Williamson, by interim coach Marley for the 2019 FIFA Women's World Cup qualification campaign. She received her first cap that month in England's first match against Kazakhstan, providing an assist in the fifteenth minute. During the campaign she was one of two senior Lionesses (with winner Beth Mead) to be nominated for the 2018 England Women's International Young Player of the Year award. Walsh, aged 21 and the youngest player in the squad, captained England for the first time during these qualifiers, starting with the armband in England's final match against Kazakhstan in September 2018, in her seventh senior appearance; she was substituted off in the second half, handing the armband to replacement Bronze, with England winning 6–0.

Walsh has represented England in three SheBelieves Cup tournaments. The team came second on Walsh's debut appearance in 2018, losing to United States by an own goal off the keeper. In 2019, Walsh, one of the three players who featured in every match, was part of the team that won the competition, providing the long-range assist for the final goal. After Walsh helped the team to victory in the 2019 SheBelieves Cup, manager Phil Neville said that she was probably the best midfielder at the time, praising her development within the squad after he had been tough on her to provoke this. Neville also encouraged veteran player Karen Carney to help mentor Walsh through the 2019 Women's World Cup, her first major tournament.

In May 2019, Walsh was selected as part of England's 2019 World Cup squad; her name was announced by DJ Monki as part of England's social-media facing squad announcement. In the opening games of the World Cup, Walsh did not play to her usual standards, but she continued to be picked to start, with Neville having faith in her game and her development; England fans, however, were heavily critical of her continued selection after the early weaker showing. Her performance in the semi-final against United States, which England lost, however, was seen as strong; she provided two long passes that produced Ellen White goals (one was disallowed) and sent a narrowly-saved "thunderbolt" strike at goal from 25yards herself. Walsh felt that the criticism of her performances was deserved, saying she lacked focus, but said this did not stop it from affecting her. She considered quitting football because of it, working with sports psychologists to rebuild her enjoyment of the game. 

Still struggling in January 2020, Walsh was encouraged by Neville and England's then-head of performance "to address her lifestyle habits" so that she could develop further and be able to focus on marginal gains. England came third in the 2020 SheBelieves Cup, held in the United States in March 2020, before returning to England and a match hiatus due to COVID-19 pandemic restrictions. By October 2020, Walsh felt that her mentality was starting to thrive again. At the time, the team were preparing for more international fixtures to return. England's qualification campaign for the 2023 Women's World Cup began in 2021; Walsh was one of four players to captain England during their record 20–0 defeat of Latvia that November.

In June 2022, Walsh was named to the England squad for the UEFA Women's Euro 2022 in July, which they won. As part of the marketing in the run-up to the tournament, an image of Walsh was projected on the facade of the National Gallery. She started every match and played all but five minutes, showing "classic understated dominance" throughout the tournament and being key to England reaching the final against Germany. In anticipation of the final it was reported that the outcome of the match could come down to whether Walsh or her contrasting counterpart Lena Oberdorf outperformed the other. England won 2–1, with Walsh providing the lauded pass for England's first goal scored by Ella Toone in the sixty-second minute; The New York Times covered the match by saying it "was Walsh's game". She was named player of the match and was subsequently included in the Team of the Tournament.

During the 2022 Euro campaign, Walsh reflected that she was able to perform so consistently because of manager Sarina Wiegman's coaching style allowing Walsh to have a good mindset, that Wiegman "[is] not bothered that we make mistakes. She's not going to shout at us or belittle us for making mistakes. She knows that that's part of the process and, for me, that gives me the confidence to try those passes"; Walsh repeated the sentiment in a press conference after she was named player of the match in England's first game after the Euro, a 2–0 win over Austria that saw them qualify for the 2023 World Cup. With her appearance in the final qualification group game, another 10–0 win over Luxembourg, Walsh won her 50th England cap.

In her early years with the England squad, Walsh was considered the "heir apparent" to Fara Williams as the midfield anchor. Since 2019, Walsh has been "an automatic starter for England, a name on the teamsheet that is never questioned", with various sports media and personalities saying that her role in the England squad is one that cannot be matched or replicated by other players.

Great Britain 
Walsh was part of the Great Britain women's football team at the 2020 Summer Olympics held in Tokyo in 2021. Team GB went out in the quarterfinals, losing to the Matildas; Walsh took the first shot at goal in this match, a powerful strike that slammed against the bottom of the post. As the game went to extra time, Walsh again opened striking, with this attempt tipped over the top of the net by a fingertip save.

Style of play 

Walsh plays for possession-based teams. She is typically played as a 'number 6' holding midfielder; "not a traditional holding English midfielder", having instead been described as "built in the mould of a traditional Spanish midfielder", her game has been consistently compared to that of Barcelona and Spain's Sergio Busquets. As has been said of Busquets, The Athletic has written that "Walsh is one of those players you might not see if you watch the game—but by watching her you see the game." As a regista (deep-lying playmaker), Walsh typically sets the tempo of matches she plays. Besides technical ability, she is also praised for her stamina and leadership.  

Walsh is statistically one of the most accurate passers in world football, and most often plays by passing. She is able to execute a large variety of passes equally over all distances and when under pressure, and has a high success rate of long passes into the final third. With her awareness of her teammates' abilities, Walsh can play long passes with good weight towards space for players to run onto and meet well. When not passing long, Walsh may set up opportunities for her attacking midfielders; playing alongside Georgia Stanway (for City and England), she can play to Stanway to attack, as a double pivot, or with their positions swapped. Walsh also often shares the pitch with Lucy Bronze (for City, England, and Barcelona); though Bronze is usually a right-back, she can come into a midfield position for link-up play with Walsh.

Not usually an attacking player, Walsh is able to strike powerfully from distance but is instead typically key in her team's build-up play. Like Spanish midfielders, Walsh can use pausing tactics to her team's advantage, spending time with the ball before picking out a pass to draw the opposition out of position or determine the best play. She can also disguise her direction, feint passes and make complete turns to break past markers and create space for herself. With her frequent scans of the field, Walsh will make herself open to receive the ball in a good position to retain possession or to use her first touch (which she will often take with the outside of her foot) to get away from pressure. She has been known to distribute balls quickly, too, accurately passing due to her positional awareness. As an often  player, Walsh can use her movements to "drag opponents around" before passing to openings this has created using her strong vision and range. 

When not with the ball, Walsh can be seen dictating direction of play, and moving to support players in possession. She can also provide defensive cover, shadowing opposition players to disrupt their play when they have possession and to allow her teammates space to progress in attack when they are on the ball. Walsh is effective in her midfield defensive actions; more likely to intercept than tackle, her tackling success rate is still high. She is reliable for interceptions and recovering loose ball situations, and supporting the back line. She will move back to support both when they are defending and to act as a stand-in when a defender moves forward in attack. When acquiring the ball during opposition presses, Walsh can break press and switch play to an attacking sequence.

In popular culture
Having been described as an artist in the game, footage of some of Walsh's ball skills have gone viral. A long pass she made in the 2019 SheBelieves Cup, taking eight Japan players out of the game, was popular. A clip of Walsh in a 2022 England training session, in which she scored a solo goal after creatively evading the members of the opposition five-a-side team, was also shared widely, particularly as it coincided with the high-profile Barcelona pursuit of her signing.

Sports media has noted that the appreciation of deeper midfielders in the women's game grew significantly following the "trailblazing" work of Walsh and Oberdorf. Football journalist Julien Laurens said on The Gab & Juls Show in September 2022 that Walsh is "the best player in the world, for [him]"; rated by various pundits to be instrumental in England winning the 2022 Euro, and described in the media as the unsung hero of the tournament and her team, other players and the media reacted with surprise when Walsh did not receive a nomination for the Ballon d'Or Féminin in August 2022.

She is nicknamed "WonderWalsh", in reference to her skill and the song "Wonderwall", which is commonly played at Manchester City games.

Personal life
Walsh is an advocate for mental health support and breaking the stigma around getting help. She has a West Highland White Terrier called Narla, who she says helps her switch off. She and Williamson came up through their international football careers together, receiving call-ups at the same time from under-15 to the senior squad, becoming best friends. Walsh is also good friends with Abbie McManus, despite supporting opposing Manchester teams, and Stanway.

Career statistics

Club

International

Honours
Blackburn Rovers
FA Girls' Youth Cup: runner-up 2013
Lancashire Women's Challenge Cup: runner-up 2014

Manchester City
FA Women's Super League: winner 2016, runner-up 2015, 2017, 2017–18, 2018–19, 2020–21
Women's FA Cup: winner 2016–17, 2018–19, 2019–20, runner-up 2021–22
FA Women's League Cup: winner 2014, 2016, 2018–19, 2021–22, runner-up 2017–18

Barcelona
Supercopa de España Femenina: 2022–23

England

UEFA Women's Championship: 2022
SheBelieves Cup: 2019
Arnold Clark Cup: 2022, 2023

Individual
Greater Manchester Young Sports Person of the Year: 2008
Blackburn Rovers Girls' Centre of Excellence Overall Achievement Trophy: 2010
Blackburn Rovers Girls' Centre of Excellence International Recognition Award: 2010
Blackburn Rovers Special Achievement Award: 2014
Northwest Football Awards Women's Rising Star: 2017
Manchester City W.F.C. Official Supporters' Club Player of the Season: 2017–18
UEFA Women's Championship Team of the Tournament: 2022
England Women's Player of the Year: third 2021–22
FIFA FIFPRO Women's World 11: 2022
Freedom of the borough of Rochdale (honoured 19 October 2022)
Freedom of the City of London (announced 1 August 2022)

Records
Youngest player to start a match as captain of England in the FA era:  (4 September 2018)

Most expensive women's football player in the world: ~£400,000 (7 September 2022)

See also 

 List of England women's international footballers
 List of Manchester City W.F.C. players
 List of people from Rochdale

References

External links

 
 Keira Walsh at FC Barcelona
 Keira Walsh at The Football Association
 
 
 
 

1997 births
Living people
2019 FIFA Women's World Cup players
Blackburn Rovers L.F.C. players
England women's international footballers
England women's under-23 international footballers
English expatriate sportspeople in Spain
English expatriate women's footballers
English women's footballers
Expatriate women's footballers in Spain
FA Women's National League players
FC Barcelona Femení players
Footballers at the 2020 Summer Olympics
Footballers educated at St Bede's College, Manchester
Footballers from Rochdale
Manchester City W.F.C. players
Olympic footballers of Great Britain
People educated at Bacup and Rawtenstall Grammar School
People educated at Haslingden High School
Primera División (women) players
UEFA Women's Championship-winning players
UEFA Women's Euro 2022 players
Women's association football forwards
Women's association football midfielders
Women's Super League players